Diary of King Yeonsan is a 1988 South Korean film directed by Im Kwon-taek. It was chosen as Best Film at the Grand Bell Awards.

Premise
A historical drama on the life of Yeonsangun of Joseon, who was the subject of director Shin Sang-ok's award-winning Prince Yeonsan (1961).

Cast
Yu In-chon as Prince Yeonsan / King Yeonsan
Kim Jin-ah as Royal Consort Jang Nok-soo
Kwon Jae-hee as Deposed Queen Shin
Kim In-moon as Kim Ja-won
Ma Hung-sik
Kim Young-ae as Princess Consort Seungpyeong / Deposed Queen Yoon
Yoon Yang-ha as King Seongjong
Han Eun-jin as Dowager Queen Insu
Ban Hyo-jung as Queen Jeonghyeon
Kang Kye-shik
Kim Gil-ho
Na Han-il as Shin Soo-geun
Kim Woon-ja 
Lee Ye-min 
Lee Do-ryeon
Lee Seok-gu
Choi-jun
Oh Hee-chan
Hwang-gun
Jang Jung-gook 
Lee Gyung-yung as King Jungjong
Choi Sung-gwan
Yoon Il-joo
Lee Gi-yung
Oh Do-gyoo
Im Saeng-chool
Park Eun-ho
Kim Jung-suk
Kim Dae-hee
Kim Yong-joon
Kim Ha-gyoon
Moon Hyun-hak
Lee Min-soo
Lee Seung-ho
Choi Doo-han
Oh Yung-hwa
Yoo Myung-soon
Kwak Eun-gyung
Kim Ji-yung
Jun-sook
Suk In-soo
Kim Ae-ra
Park Ye-sook
Joo Hee-ah
Moon Jung-hee
Im Hee-soo
Yeo Won-sun
Hong Won-sun

References

Bibliography

External links

1987 films
1980s historical drama films
South Korean historical drama films
South Korean biographical drama films
Films set in the 15th century
Films set in the Joseon dynasty
Films set in Seoul
Films directed by Im Kwon-taek
Best Picture Grand Bell Award winners
1980s Korean-language films
1980s biographical drama films
1987 drama films
1988 drama films
1988 films